The Deli Creeps were an avant-garde band consisting of singer Maximum Bob, guitarist Buckethead, drummer Pinchface and various bass players, most recently Daniel Monti. Though Buckethead is the only member who makes a consistent effort to hide his identity, little is known about the other members of the band. Deli Creeps have never released an official album, but many of their songs have been repurposed for Buckhead's solo albums.

Biography 
The Deli Creeps formed in the late 1980s/early 1990s in Claremont, Southern California, United States, but shortly after moved to San Francisco. In 1991 they released their first demo tape with bassist Tony Black, after which they gained a strong loyal following before splitting up for the first time. Maximum Bob contributed to the John Zorn produced debut album of Mr. Bungle.

The band reformed in 1996 for the first time and released a second demo tape. In the interim only Buckethead through his contacts to John Zorn, Bill Laswell and Bootsy Collins had gained some public attention. Shortly after their second demo they had all moved on once again before reforming for the second time in 2003 with Josh Bockles on bass. They played some concerts in California. Buckethead was also guitarist for Guns N' Roses then.

Their first feature length album Dawn of the Deli Creeps was released in late 2005. Dan Monti (a technician for Metallica, Guns N' Roses and Serj Tankian), longtime Buckethead collaborator, performed on bass, alongside several tracks performed by Tony Black. Featured on the album is the title track for the Terry M. West horror movie Flesh for the Beast.

Some early video recordings of the band were released in 2006/07 on several Buckethead DVDs, including some complete concerts from 1990/91.

The band members of the last incarnation still work together on different projects. Maximum Bob contributed guest vocals to Buckethead's album Enter the Chicken (2005) and the Praxis release Profanation (Preparation for a Coming Darkness) (2008). Buckethead, Pinchface and Monti toured the US in 2005 as a trio.

Mike Patton has been quoted as saying: "They're so good they piss me off".

Style 
The band derivates its name from delicatessen shop and creeps and usually enters the stage with aprons on (much like butchers). Buckethead uses variations of his famous face mask, but mostly wears hats instead of the bucket.

Distinctive marks of the formation in particular are Maximum Bob's lyrics of sex and personal life plus his differentiating recitation between melodic singing and psychotic screams. As a further trademark he developed a special form of recitative with onomatopoeic stuttering. Buckethead as the main instrumental performer supports or counteracts this with the use of all his typical stylistic devices: chromatic runs and dissonant playing noises, but also riffs and chord progressions or short citations from blues and country.

Discography 
1990: Demo Tape
1991: Demo Tape
1996: Demo Tape
2005: Flesh For The Beast soundtrack (rated and unrated versions)
2005: Dawn of the Deli CreepsMany live bootleg recordings can be found amongst traders and fans.

The Deli Creeps are also featured on the following Buckethead DVDs:
Secret Recipe
Young Buckethead Vol. 1
Young Buckethead Vol. 2

 Track Listing of Deli Creeps 1990 Demo Tape [23:46]  

 Track Listing of Deli Creeps 1991 Demo Tape [21:06]  

 Track Listing of Deli Creeps 1996 Demo Tape [33:24] 

 Track Listing of Dawn of the Deli Creeps [57:38] 

 Notes 
Some of Buckethead's songs originate from Deli Creeps material:
 The Deli Creeps song "Smilin Charlie" was later released as "Post Office Buddy" on Giant Robot (1994)
 The same album that featured "Post Office Buddy" also featured an instrumental version of "Binge and Grab", a song performed live with the Deli Creeps featuring lyrics, the version with lyrics has yet to be released as a studio version.
 "Random Killing" became "I Come in Peace" on Giant Robot and "Power & Gory" on the Cornbugs' debut album Spot the Psycho'' (1999).
 Sometimes during live Deli Creeps performances, Buckethead would play some of his own material.
 Buckethead plays a sample of the chorus riff from "Time" midway through the Acoustic Shards song "Box Elders" (recorded in 1991).
The song "Brazos," a song Buckethead wrote for a guitar magazine contest in 1988, was featured on the Deli Creeps first demo, under the name "Tribal Rites".
 The song "Dream Girl" was rerecorded by the Cornbugs with different lyrics as "Sacramento".

Credits 
Buckethead - Guitar
Maximum Bob - Vocals
Pinchface - Drums, Backing Vocals
Dan Monti - Bass

References

External links 
 Deli Creeps Official Website - offline (Backup in the Internet Archives)
 Buckethead's Official Website
 Dawn of the Deli Creeps digital album on Maximum Bob's Bandcamp site

American funk metal musical groups
Buckethead
Heavy metal musical groups from California